This is a list of cricketers who have played matches for the Sialkot cricket team.

 Mohammad Abbas
 Nayyer Abbas
 Qaiser Abbas
 Ijaz Ahmed
 Hasan Ali
 Mohammad Ali
 Mansoor Amjad
 Shakeel Ansar
 Jamal Anwar
 Shaiman Anwar
 Naved Arif
 Bilal Asif
 Mohammad Asif
 Umaid Asif
 Mohammad Ayub
 Bilawal Bhatti
 Amad Butt
 Kashif Daud
 Bilal Hussain
 Mohammad Imran
 Inam-ul-Haq
 Majeed Jahangir
 Ali Khan
 Tahir Mahmood
 Shehzad Malik
 Shoaib Malik
 Tahir Mughal
 Usman Mushtaq
 Naeemuddin
 Naved-ul-Hasan
 Faisal Naved
 Imran Nazir
 Jaffar Nazir
 Kashif Raza
 Abdur Rehman
 Basit Saeed
 Zahid Saeed
 Naved Sarwar
 Obaidullah Sarwar
 Haris Sohail
 Imran Tahir
 Aamer Wasim
 Kamran Younis
 Shahid Yousuf

References 

Lists of Pakistani cricketers